Mediocalcar is a genus of flowering plants from the orchid family, Orchidaceae. It is native to New Guinea, eastern Indonesia, and the islands of the western Pacific.  The orchid abbreviation is Med.

Mediocalcar agathodaemonis J.J.Sm.
Mediocalcar arfakense J.J.Sm.
Mediocalcar bifolium J.J.Sm.
Mediocalcar brachygenium Schltr.
Mediocalcar bulbophylloides J.J.Sm.
Mediocalcar congestum Schuit.
Mediocalcar crenulatum J.J.Sm.
Mediocalcar decoratum Schuit.
Mediocalcar geniculatum J.J.Sm.
Mediocalcar papuanum R.S.Rogers
Mediocalcar paradoxum (Kraenzl.) Schltr.
Mediocalcar pygmaeum Schltr.
Mediocalcar stevenscoodei P.Royen
Mediocalcar subteres Schuit.
Mediocalcar umboiense Schuit.
Mediocalcar uniflorum Schltr.
Mediocalcar versteegii J.J.Sm.

See also 
 List of Orchidaceae genera

References 

 Pridgeon, A.M., Cribb, P.J., Chase, M.A. & Rasmussen, F. eds. (1999). Genera Orchidacearum 1. Oxford Univ. Press.
 Pridgeon, A.M., Cribb, P.J., Chase, M.A. & Rasmussen, F. eds. (2001). Genera Orchidacearum 2. Oxford Univ. Press.
 Pridgeon, A.M., Cribb, P.J., Chase, M.A. & Rasmussen, F. eds. (2003). Genera Orchidacearum 3. Oxford Univ. Press
 Berg Pana, H. 2005. Handbuch der Orchideen-Namen. Dictionary of Orchid Names. Dizionario dei nomi delle orchidee. Ulmer, Stuttgart

External links 

Podochileae genera
Eriinae